Charles Griffin was an American Negro league pitcher in the 1880s.

Griffin played for the Pittsburgh Keystones in 1887. In five recorded appearances on the mound, he posted a 1.01 ERA over 35.2 innings.

References

External links
Baseball statistics and player information from Baseball-Reference Black Baseball Stats and Seamheads

Year of birth missing
Year of death missing
Place of birth missing
Place of death missing
Pittsburgh Keystones players
Baseball pitchers